Chicken Creek is a tributary stream of the Sevier River, in Juab and Sanpete counties of Utah.

See also
List of rivers of Utah

References

Rivers of Utah
Rivers of Sanpete County, Utah
Rivers of Juab County, Utah